Bocelli is the second studio album by Andrea Bocelli, released in 1995 on the Polydor GmbH label.

This album is the follow-up to his debut album, Il mare calmo della sera. In Germany, the album was certified 4× Platinum for shipping two million units, making it one of the best-selling albums ever in the country. It was also certified 4× Platinum in Switzerland, 2× Platinum in the Netherlands, and Platinum in Austria.

Track listing
"Con te partirò"
"Per amore"
"Macchine da guerra"
"E chiove"
"Romanza"
"The Power of Love"
"Vivo per lei" (with Giorgia)
"Le tue parole"
"Sempre sempre"
"Voglio restare così"
"Vivo per lei" (Bonus track, with Judy Weiss)

See

Chart performance

Weekly charts

Year-end charts

Certifications and sales

See also
 List of best-selling albums in Germany

References

1995 albums
Andrea Bocelli albums
Classical crossover albums